The 10th Independent Spirit Awards, honoring the best in independent filmmaking for 1994, were announced on March 25, 1995. Hosted by Kevin Pollak, it was the second ceremony to be held under a tent in a parking lot on the beach in Santa Monica.

Winners and nominees

Films that received multiple nominations

Films that won multiple awards

Special awards

Special Distinction Award
Hoop Dreams

Someone to Watch Award
Lodge Kerrigan – Clean, Shaven

Friends of Independence Award
Samuel Goldwyn Jr.

References

External links 
1994 Spirit Awards at IMDb
Full show on Film Independent's official YouTube channel

1994
Independent Spirit Awards